The 2012 Honda Grand Prix of St. Petersburg was the first race of the 2012 IndyCar Series season. It was held on March 25, 2012 in St. Petersburg, Florida on the city's temporary street course, and was won by Hélio Castroneves.

Report

Background
This race was the first race since Dan Wheldon was killed in an accident, five month earlier during the 2011 IZOD IndyCar World Championship at Las Vegas Motor Speedway in October 2011. It was also the first race run with the new ICONIC chassis by Dallara, which Wheldon was helping to develop and was named the "DW12" in his honor. This race also marked the first time since the end of the 2005 season that Honda wouldn't be IndyCar's exclusive engine supplier. Chevrolet re-entered Indy racing for the first time since that season and Lotus was the third supplier.

Qualifying
For the third consecutive year, Will Power took the pole position for the Honda Grand Prix of St. Petersburg with a circuit-qualifying record of 1:01.3721.  Alongside of Power, Penske teammate Ryan Briscoe will start in row one, in second position.  The second row will be occupied Ryan Hunter-Reay and James Hinchcliffe, both of Andretti Autosport.

Race
The 2012 Honda Grand Prix of St. Petersburg started with pole sitter Will Power leading the field for the majority of the first few laps, with Ryan Briscoe, who qualified second, trailing behind him.  Briscoe would eventually take the lead after Power pitted, in for fuel strategy.  However, the pit stop by Power would eventually take him out of contention for the race, as he would not near the top spot for the remaining laps.  While Briscoe did hold the top position for eight laps, it was Scott Dixon, who was consistently around the top and eventually would inherit the lead on lap 20.  Throughout the entirety of the race, Lotus Cars such as rookie Katherine Legge and Simona de Silvestro face mechanical problems, as Lotus finished third between the manufactures, behind Chevrolet and Honda.  During the mid-portion of the race, drivers such as Takuma Sato, defending series champion Dario Franchitti and J. R. Hildebrand would all hold a lead in the race.  However, coming down to the end, it would be Hélio Castroneves and Dixon battling for the lead in the race and the victory.  After a series of pit stops on lap 72, Castroneves would make a bold pass on Dixon, giving him position behind, then leader Hildebrand.  This position would eventually allow him to inherit the lead of the race, as Castroneves would lead the final 26 laps, giving him the victory, his first victory since the 2010 season.

Classification

Starting grid

Race Results

Notes
 Points include 1 point for pole position and 2 points for most laps led.

Championship standings after the race
Drivers' Championship standings

 Note: Only the top five positions are included.

References

Honda Grand Prix of St. Petersburg
Grand Prix of St. Petersburg
Honda Grand Prix of St. Petersburg
Honda Grand Prix of St. Petersburg
21st century in St. Petersburg, Florida